GO 58 is a Floating dry dock of the Marina Militare.

References

External links
 Ships Marina Militare website

Ships built in Italy
Auxiliary ships of the Italian Navy
1995 ships
Floating drydocks